55 Short Stories from the New Yorker is a literary anthology of short fiction first published in The New Yorker magazine from the years 1940 through 1949.

Front Cover
Although the magazine debuted in February 1925 (so that its 25th anniversary was in 1950), this 1949 book's subtitle reads, "A twenty-fifth anniversary volume of stories that have appeared in the magazine during the last decade."  As with the annual anniversary issue of the eponymous magazine, the cover depicts Eustace Tilley with his monocle, in the classic iconograph.

The cover subtitles also include "1940 to 1950," but the copyright date of 1949 suggests that material from 1950, and possibly the latter part of 1949, was not included; individual years listed after "copyright" also recite each of the years in the 1940s, but not 1950.

Authors
One story from each of 55 different authors is included.  The authors (and some selected story titles) are
Roger Angell
S. N. Behrman
Ludwig Bemelmans
Sally Benson
Isabel Bolton
Kay Boyle
Bessie Breuer
Hortense Calisher
John Cheever ("The Enormous Radio")
Robert M. Coates
John Collier
Rhys Davies
Robert Gorham Davis
Daniel Fuchs
Wolcott Gibbs
Brendan Gill
Emily Hahn
Nancy Hale
Shirley Jackson ("The Lottery")
Christopher La Farge
Oliver La Farge
A. J. Liebling
Victoria Lincoln
Russell Maloney
James A. Maxwell
William Maxwell
Mary McCarthy
Carson McCullers
Robert McLaughlin
John McNulty
Vladimir Nabokov ("Colette")
Edward Newhouse
Frank O'Connor
John O'Hara
Mollie Panter-Downes
James Reid Parker
Elizabeth Parsons
Frances Gray Patton
Astrid Peters
John Powell
Marjorie Kinnan Rawlings
John Andrews Rice
J. D. Salinger ("A Perfect Day for Bananafish")
Mark Schorer
Irwin Shaw
Jean Stafford
Peter Taylor
James Thurber ("The Catbird Seat")
Niccolò Tucci
Sylvia Townsend Warner
Jerome Weidman
Jessamyn West
Christine Weston
E. B. White
Wendell Wilcox

Editorial comment
In the short Foreword, the editors state that "[s]ome notable stories are missing" for purposes of balance, and also that "parody, nonsense, and casual essays" have been excluded as "outside the scope of this book." There is a conventional table of contents and an index lists each story alphabetically by its author's last name.  There is no other content, except the stories themselves.

Binding

1949 anthologies
Fiction anthologies
Works originally published in The New Yorker
Simon & Schuster books
American anthologies